I'm Not Leaving may refer to:

 "I'm Not Leaving", a 2019 song by Keane from Cause and Effect
 "I'm Not Leaving", a 2011 song by Sneaky Sound System from From Here to Anywhere
 "I'm Not Leaving", a 2009 song by Uncle Kracker from Happy Hour